Bray-Saint Aignan is a commune in the department of Loiret, central France. The municipality was established on 1 January 2017 by merger of the former communes of Bray-en-Val (the seat) and Saint-Aignan-des-Gués.

See also 
Communes of the Loiret department

References 

Communes of Loiret